Povondraite is a rare silicate mineral from the tourmaline group with formula:  NaFe3+3(Fe3+4,Mg2)(BO3)3Si6O18(OH)3O. It is a dark brown to black nearly opaque mineral with a resinous to splendent luster. It crystallizes in the trigonal crystal system as equant, distorted prisms with trigonal pyramid terminations.

It occurs as rare fracture and cavity encrustations within schists derived  from sedimentary rocks. Associated minerals include quartz, potassium feldspar, muscovite, schorl, riebeckite and magnesite.

Discovered at the San Francisco mine, near Villa Tunari (in Alto Chapare), Bolivia, in 1976, originally it was called ferridravite, for the composition and the assumed relationship to dravite, i.e., "ferric dravite". However later investigations yielded a new empirical formula which had no relation to the dravite. This called for renaming, and the new name, after Pavel Povondra (1924–2013), a mineralogist at the Charles University in Prague, was approved by the International Mineralogical Association in the 1990s.

References

Cyclosilicates
Iron(III) minerals
Manganese minerals
Sodium minerals
Trigonal minerals
Minerals in space group 160
Tourmalines